The Juventus Training Center (colloquially known as "the Vinovo") is a football training facility owned by Juventus, located in Vinovo a comune 14 kilometres southwest of the city of Turin. Designed by GAU and Shesa, the training ground features modern facilities and was opened in August 2006. The facility measures a total of 162,900 square meters and originally cost € 12.5 million.

Owned trough Campi di Vinovo S.p.A., controlled by the club to 71.3% until 2003, until 2018, it was used as a training ground for the Juventus men's team until the construction of the new training center; it is now exclusively used for the matches and training for that of the Juventus youth sector (already from 2017), and that of the women's team.

Facilities
The training area includes:

eleven regular playing fields (nine in natural grass and two in synthetic grass), of which:
one of reduced size;
one with a mobile pressostatic cover, used in case of cold and bad weather;
the "Campo Ale & Ricky" (dedicated to the memory of Alessio Ferramosca and Riccardo Neri, youths of the young bianconeri who drowned in a facility pond), with a 400-seat grandstand, reserved for matches housewives of Juventus Women and of all the Juventus youth sector;
a swimming pool that allows counter-current swimming and hydro massage;
a physiotherapy center;
a gym for heating and muscle building;
soccer tennis;
seven locker rooms for competitive sports (one for Juventus Women and six for youth teams);
two warehouses.

The media center includes:

a hotel of about 350 m²;
a sports medicine center;
a room for technical meetings;
the JTV television studios;
the press room, which can accommodate up to 30 journalists, for press conferences.

References

Notes

Other publications

External links
  

Juventus F.C.
Juventus
Sports venues in Italy
Sports venues in Piedmont
Sports venues completed in 2006
2006 establishments in Italy